Cheilosia bardus is a species of hoverfly belonging to the family Syrphidae.

Distribution
United States:Vermont, Maine 
Canada: Ontario, New Brunswick, Nova Scotia, Quebec
Western Palaearctic region

References

Eristalinae
Insects described in 1780
Taxa named by Moses Harris
Diptera of Europe
Diptera of North America
Hoverflies of North America